The borate minerals are minerals which contain a borate anion group. The borate (BO3) units may be polymerised similar to the SiO4 unit of the silicate mineral class. This results in B2O5, B3O6, B2O4 anions as well as more complex structures which include hydroxide or halogen anions. The [B(O,OH)4]− anion exists as well.

Many borate minerals, such as borax, colemanite, and ulexite, are salts: soft, readily soluble, and found in evaporite contexts. However, some, such as boracite, are hard and resistant to weathering, more similar to the silicates.

There are over 100 different borate minerals. Borate minerals include:
Kernite Na2B4O6(OH)2·3H2O 
Borax Na2B4O5(OH)4·8H2O
Ulexite NaCaB5O6(OH)6·5H2O
Colemanite CaB3O4(OH)3·H2O
Boracite Mg3B7O13Cl
Painite CaZrAl9O15(BO3)

Nickel–Strunz Classification -06- Borates 
IMA-CNMNC proposes a new hierarchical scheme (Mills et al., 2009). This list uses it to modify the Classification of Nickel–Strunz (mindat.org, 10 ed, pending publication). Note that although Nickel–Strunz division letters were traditionally based on the number of boron atoms in a mineral's chemical formula (06.A are monoborates, 06.B are diborates, etc.), the IMA has reclassified borate minerals based on the polymerisation of the borate anion.

Abbreviations
 REE: rare-earth element (Sc, Y, La, Ce, Pr, Nd, Pm, Sm, Eu, Gd, Tb, Dy, Ho, Er, Tm, Yb, Lu)
 PGE: platinum-group element (Ru, Rh, Pd, Os, Ir, Pt)
 * : discredited (IMA/CNMNC status)
 ? : questionable/doubtful (IMA/CNMNC status)
Regarding 03.C Aluminofluorides, 06 Borates, 08 Vanadates (04.H V[5,6] Vanadates), 09 Silicates:
 neso-: insular (from Greek  , "island")
 soro-: grouped (from Greek  , "heap, pile, mound")
 cyclo-: rings of (from Greek  , "circle")
 ino-: chained (from Greek  , "fibre", [from Ancient Greek ]) 
 phyllo-: sheets of (from Greek  , "leaf") 
 tekto-: three-dimensional framework (from Greek  , "of building")
Nickel–Strunz code scheme NN.XY.##x
 NN: Nickel–Strunz mineral class number
 X: Nickel–Strunz mineral division letter
 Y: Nickel–Strunz mineral family letter
 ##x: Nickel–Strunz mineral/group number; x an add-on letter

Class: borates 
 06. Alfredstelznerite
 06.A Monoborates
 06.AA BO3, without additional anions; 1(D): 05 Sassolite; 15 Nordenskioldine, 15 Tusionite; 35 Jimboite, 35 Kotoite; 40 Takedaite 
 06.AB BO3, with additional anions; 1(D) + OH, etc.: 05 Hambergite, 10 Berborite, 15 Jeremejevite; 20 Warwickite, 20 Yuanfuliite; 25 Karlite; 30 Azoproite, 30 Bonaccordite, 30 Fredrikssonite, 30 Ludwigite, 30 Vonsenite; 35 Pinakiolite; 40 Blatterite, 40 Orthopinakiolite, 40 Takeuchiite, 40 Chestermanite; 45 Hulsite, 45 Magnesiohulsite, 45 Aluminomagnesiohulsite; 50 Hydroxylborite, 50 Fluoborite; 55 Shabynite, 55 Wightmanite; 60 Gaudefroyite, 65 Sakhaite, 70 Harkerite; 75 IMA2008-060, 75 Pertsevite; 80 Jacquesdietrichite, 85 Painite   
 06.AC B(O,OH)4, without and with additional anions; 1(T), 1(T)+OH, etc.: 05 Sinhalite; 10 Pseudosinhalite; 15 Béhierite, 15 Schiavinatoite; 20 Frolovite; 25 Hexahydroborite; 30 Henmilite; 35 Bandylite; 40 Teepleite; 45 Moydite-(Y); 50 Carboborite; 55 Sulfoborite; 60 Luneburgite; 65 Seamanite; 70 Cahnite 
 06.H Unclassified Borates
 06.HA Unclassified borates: 05 Chelkarite; 10 Braitschite-(Ce); 15 Satimolite; 20 Iquiqueite; 25 Wardsmithite; 30 Korzhinskite; 35 Halurgite; 40 Ekaterinite; 45 Vitimite; 50 Canavesite; 55 Qilianshanite

Subclass: nesoborates 

 06.BA Neso-diborates with double triangles B2(O,OH)5; 2(2D); 2(2D) + OH, etc.: 05 Suanite; 10 Clinokurchatovite, 10 Kurchatovite; 15 Sussexite, 15 Szaibelyite; 20 Wiserite
 06.BB Neso-diborates with double tetrahedra B2O(OH)6; 2(2T): 05 Pinnoite; 10 Pentahydroborite
 06.CA Neso-triborates: 10 Ameghinite; 15 Inderite; 20 Kurnakovite; 25 Inderborite; 30 Meyerhofferite; 35 Inyoite; 40 Solongoite; 45 Peprossiite-(Ce); 50 Nifontovite; 55 Olshanskyite 
 06.DA Neso-tetraborates: 10 Borax; 15 Tincalconite; 20 Hungchaoite; 25 Fedorovskite, 25 Roweite; 30 Hydrochlorborite; 35 Uralborite; 40 Numanoite, 40 Borcarite; 60 Fontarnauite
 06.EA Neso-pentaborates: 05 Sborgite; 10 Ramanite-(Rb), 10 Ramanite-(Cs), 10 Santite; 15 Ammonioborite; 25 Ulexite
 06.FA Neso-hexaborates: 05 Aksaite; 10 Mcallisterite; 15 Admontite; 20 Rivadavite; 25 Teruggite

Subclass: inoborates 

 06.BC Ino-diborates with triangles and/or tetrahedra: 10 Calciborite, 10 Aldzhanite*; 15 Vimsite; 20 Sibirskite, 20 Parasibirskite
 06.CB Ino-triborates: 10 Colemanite; 15 Hydroboracite; 20 Howlite; 25 Jarandolite
 06.DB Ino-tetraborates: 05 Kernite
 06.EB Ino-pentaborates: 05 Larderellite; 10 Ezcurrite; 15 Probertite; 20 Tertschite; 25 Priceite
 06.FB Ino-hexaborates: 05 Aristarainite; 10 Kaliborite

Subclass: phylloborates 

 06.CC Phyllo-triborates: 05 Johachidolite
 06.EC Phyllo-pentaborates: 05 Biringuccite, 05 Nasinite; 10 Gowerite; 15  Veatchite, 15 Veatchite-A, 15 Veatchite-p; 20 Volkovskite; 25 Tuzlaite; 30 Heidornite; 35 Brianroulstonite
 06.FC Phyllo-hexaborates: 05 Nobleite, 05 Tunellite, 05 Balavinskite; 10 Strontioborite; 15 Ginorite, 15 Strontioginorite; 20 Fabianite
 06.GB Phyllo-nonaborates, etc.: 05 Studenitsite; 10 Penobsquisite; 15 Preobrazhenskite; 20 Walkerite

Subclass: tektoborates 

 06.BD Tektodiborates with tetrahedra: 05 Santarosaite
 06.DD Tekto-tetraborates: 05 Diomignite
 06.ED Tekto-pentaborates: 05 IMA2007-047, 05 Tyretskite, 05 Hilgardite, 05 Kurgantaite 
 06.GA Tekto-heptaborates: 05 Boracite, 05 Chambersite, 05 Ericaite; 10 Congolite, 10 Trembathite
 06.GC Tekto-dodecaborates: 05 Rhodizite, 05 Londonite
 06.GD Mega-tektoborates: 05 Ruitenbergite, 05 Pringleite; 10 Metaborite

See also

 Classification of minerals - Non-silicates
 Classification of minerals - Silicates

References

 
 
 Hr. Dr. Udo Neumann der Uni-Tuebingen (Systematik der Minerale)

External links